Chasers may refer to: 

 The Chaser, the Australian comedy/satire group, most famous for their television programmes on the ABC
 Chasers (film), the 1994 comedy film starring Tom Berenger, William McNamara, and Erika Eleniak